This is a list of members elected to the 2nd Nepalese Constituent Assembly at the 2013 Nepalese Constituent Assembly election and subsequent by-elections.

The list is arranged by constituency for members elected through direct elections and by last name for members elected through the party list. Subas Chandra Nemwang served as Chairman of the Constituent Assembly and Onsari Gharti Magar served as the Speaker of the Legislature Parliament. Sushil Koirala, K.P. Sharma Oli, Pushpa Kamal Dahal and Sher Bahadur Deuba served as prime ministers during the term of the parliament.

Constituent Assembly composition

List of members elected by party

Party changes or defections

By-elections or replacements

References

External links 

 नेपालको निर्वाचनको इतिहास (Electoral History of Nepal) (in Nepali)
 संसदीय विवरण पुस्तिका, संविधान सभा व्यवस्थापिका-संसद (२०७० - २०७२) (Parliament Report Booklet, Constituent Assembly Legislature Parliament (2014 - 2015)) (in Nepali)
 संसदीय विवरण पुस्तिका, रुपान्तरित व्यवस्थापिका-संसद (२०७२ - २०७४) (Parliament Report Booklet, Transformed Legislature Parliament  (2015 - 2017)) (in Nepali)

Constituent Assembly election
Constituent Assembly election 2013
 Nepalese Constituent Assembly election